Love Hate may refer to:

Psychology
 Ambivalence, co-existing contradictory impulses, agony of ambivalence
 Love–hate relationship, relationship involving simultaneous or alternating emotions of love and hate
 Love and hate (psychoanalysis)
 Splitting (psychology), failure in a person's thinking to bring together both positive and negative qualities of the self and others into a cohesive, realistic whole

Film and TV
 Love/Hate (TV series), Irish TV drama
 Love + Hate (2005 film), drama film set in Northern England

Media
 Love/Hate (band), American hard rock band
 Love/Hate (The-Dream album), 2007
 Love/Hate (Nine Black Alps album), 2007
 "Love/Hate", a song by  Betty Blowtorch
 "Love/Hate", a song by Kelly Rowland from Simply Deep
 "Hate/Love", a song by Eskimo Callboy

See also
Love and Hate (disambiguation)
Love Hate Love, a 1971 American made-for-television drama film